The LSU Tigers football team represents Louisiana State University in the sport of American football. LSU has competed in 54 bowl games (with 53 being sanctioned by the NCAA) in its history, going 29–24–1 in NCAA sanctioned bowl games. The Tigers have played in at least one bowl game in every season since 2000; their streak of 20 bowl seasons is the fourth-longest active streak in the NCAA and second-longest in the Southeastern Conference.

Bowl games

Notes

References

LSU
LSU Tigers football bowl games
LSU Tigers bowl games